Cambridge Bay LORAN Tower was a  tall free-standing lattice tower at Cambridge Bay, Nunavut, Canada. It was built in 1947/48 for LORAN transmissions and was the tallest freestanding structure in Canada for several years. Later the tower was used as a non-directional beacon (NDB) and was often called the "CB" beacon after the morse code letters that it transmitted on 245 kHz, with an output power of 2000 watts. What appeared to be guy-wires on the tower were "top loading" forming part of the antenna.

The tower, built in 1947, became redundant with the construction of the Distant Early Warning Line in the 1950s.

In 2013, the tower was determined to be structurally unsound and scheduled for demolition, to be replaced by a  tower. The removal, which was supposed to have been completed in October 2013, didn't begin until the evening of 4 August 2014 and was completed on 5 August 2014.

See also 
 List of towers

References

External links 

 Virtual museum of Cambridge Bay

Lattice towers
Former radio masts and towers
LORAN-C transmitters in Canada
Kitikmeot Region
Buildings and structures in Nunavut
Transport in Nunavut
Towers completed in 1947
Buildings and structures demolished in 2014
1947 establishments in the Northwest Territories
2014 disestablishments in Nunavut